The Getaway King is a Polish-language action comedy film directed by Mateusz Rakowicz, and written by Rakowicz and Łukasz M. Maciejewski. The film had premiered on 18 August 2021 on the New Horizons Film Festival in Wrocław, Poland, and later in cinemas on 16 September 2021. The film was based on the life of Zdzisław Najmrodzki, a criminal and thief who was active in the Polish People's Republic in the 1980s, and who was notable for escaping from prison and the authorities 29 times.

Production 
The film was directed by Mateusz Rakowicz, being his feature film debut. The script for the movie was written by Rakowicz and Łukasz M. Maciejewski. The film was produced by Agnieszka Odorowicz and Andrzej Papis. It was filmed in Kraków, Zabrze and Warsaw, with Jacek Podgórski as main cameraman. The music to the film was composed by Andrzej Smolik.

The film was mainly produced by TV & Film Production, and additionally co-produced by Grupa Polsat Plus and Mazovia Warsaw Film Commission. It was subsidized by the Polish Film Institute and was distributed in Poland by Dystrybucja Mówi Serwis.

The titular character, Zdzisław Najmrodzki, was played by Dawid Ogrodnik, while Robert Więckiewicz played lieutenant Barski from the Citizens' Militia, and Masza Wągrocka played Teresa, Najmrodzki's love interest. The other roles included: Rafał Zawierucha as Ujma, Jakub Gierszał as Antos, and Andrzej Andrzejewski as Teplic.

The film had premiered on 18 August 2021, at the New Horizons Film Festival in Wrocław, Poland, and later in cinemas on 16 September 2021. It is also was played at the Gdynia Film Festival at the end of September 2021. The film was originally planned to premiere in the autumn of 2020, however it was rescheduled due to the COVID-19 pandemic.

It was awarded the audience award at the 2021 Kraków Film Festival, and award for the best costumes for Marta Ostrowicz's work at 2021 Gdynia Film Festival, and was also nominated for the Golden Lions award at the same festival.

Cast

Main and secondary 
 Dawid Ogrodnik as Zdzisław Najmrodzki
 Robert Więckiewicz as lieutenant Barski
 Rafał Zawierucha as Ujma
 Masza Wągrocka as Teresa
 Jakub Gierszał as Antos
 Andrzej Andrzejewski as Teplic
 Sandra Drzymalska as "Młoda"
 Dorota Kolak as Mira, Zdzisław's mother
 Tomasz Sapryk as Teresa's father
 Bartosz Roch Nowicki as Roch the hippe, Mira's boyfriend

Cameos 
 Mikołaj Cieślak as the negotiating client
 Izabela Dąbrowska as the school headmaster
 Olga Bołądź as Gabi
 Adam Cywka as the captain of Civilian's Militia
 Artur Krajewski as the professor client
 Paweł Koślik as the hen-pecked husband client
 Barbara Wysocka as the wife of the hen-pecked husband client
 Grzegorz Falkowski as the "just watching" (Apatche) client
 Olga Sarzyńska as miss "Poodle"
 Radosław Rożniecki as the actor in 997 progremme
Arkadiusz Machel as Machela, the prison guard
Robert Jarociński as the television presenter
Marcin Sitek as the presenter of 997 programme
 Barbara Jonak as the forensic science technician
Emil Brygoła as the receiver

Awards 
The audience award at the 2021 Kraków Film Festival
Award for the best costumes for Marta Ostrowicz at the 2021 Gdynia Film Festival
Nomination for the Golden Lions award at the 2021 Gdynia Film Festival

Reception

Citations

Notes

References

External links 
 The Getaway King in IMDb
 The Getaway King in FilmPolski.pl (Polish)

2021 films
Polish action films
Polish comedy films
Polish crime films
Polish historical films
Polish biographical films
2021 directorial debut films
2021 action films
2021 comedy films
2021 crime films
Biographical films about criminals
2020s Polish-language films
Films postponed due to the COVID-19 pandemic